Kandathil Sebastian is the author of two bestselling novels: Dolmens in the Blue Mountain (2013) and Wisdom of the White Mountain (2014).

Sebastian lives in Delhi and was born in Kerala State, India. He holds a master's degree in Social Work and a PhD in Public Health from Jawaharlal Nehru University, New Delhi. He has worked in the health and development sector since 1989. He is also a writer of public health-related articles.

Life and career
Born in Kottayam, studied in Mahatma Gandhi University, Kottayam and Jawaharlal Nehru University, New Delhi. He currently works in the Social Development sector in India.

References

1966 births
Living people
Writers from Kottayam
Mahatma Gandhi University, Kerala alumni